Hallamaa is a Finnish-language surname. Notable people with the surname include:

 Heikki Hallamaa (1867–1951), Finnish sport shooter
 Reino Hallamaa (1899–1979), Finnish colonel

See also 
 Jaakko Hallama (1917–1996), Foreign Minister of Finland from 1963 to 1964

Finnish-language surnames